Camponotus fragilis is a species of ant in the genus Camponotus. It was first described by Theodore Pergande in 1893 and is endemic to the Southwestern United States.

Distribution
These ants have a known range of Northern Mexico, Northern and Southern California, New Mexico, Arizona, and most of the islands in the Gulf of California.

Appearance
Camponotus fragilis have an orange complexion with a slightly darker gaster and head.

References

fragilis
Insects described in 1893